(English: Men's First Division) or D1 is the second-tier basketball competition among clubs in Iceland. It is organized by the Icelandic Basketball Federation.
The season consists of a home-and-away schedule of 18 games, followed by a four-team playoff round. Both semifinals and finals series are best-of-three. The top team from the regular-season phase and the four-team playoff round winner are promoted to the Úrvalsdeild karla. The bottom club is relegated, and replaced by the four-team playoff round winner of the third-tier 2. deild karla.

History

Creation
The  was founded in 1964.

ÍS and ÍKF's dominance

Fram Reykjavík's leadership

Danny Shouse
In 1979, Danny Shouse joined Ármann and took the league by storm. On December 1, 1979, Shouse scored 100 points against Skallagrímur, setting the Icelandic single-game scoring record.  In January 1980 he scored 76 points in an overtime loss against Grindavík and in February he broke the 70 point barrier again, scoring 72 points against Þór Akureyri. His scoring prowess helped Ármann win the league and achieve promotion to the Úrvalsdeild karla. Even though Shouse played in the nation's tier 2 league during his first season, he was widely regarded as one of the best players in the country.

The double fall of ÍR
After their golden years, in which they won 15 Úrvalsdeild karla titles in less than 25 years, the ÍR was relegated to the First Division.
Afterwards, the ÍR was relegated again to the 1. deild. In the 1999–00 season they won their second 1. deild title and came back to the Úrvalsdeild karla.

Modern era
In the 2006–07 season, Þór Akureyri won their fifth title. In the following season, the 2007–08 season, Breiðablik also won their fifth title, becoming the most successful franchise together with Þór Akureyri. 
In the 2011–12 season, KFÍ won their fourth title.

On 13 March 2020, the rest of the 2019–20 season was postponed due to the coronavirus outbreak in Iceland.

Teams
The league originated in 1964 and currently consists of nine teams. Þór Akureyri have won the most championships with six titles.

The current  teams for the 2022–23 season are:

Champions

Titles per club

ÍKF merged into Ungmennafélag Njarðvíkur in 1969 and became its basketball subdivision. It is today known as Njarðvík. The club won 2 titles under the ÍKF name and has added 1 more after the merger

Awards and honors

Individual awards

Domestic All-First team

References

External links
 KKÍ
1. deild karla - kki.is
EUROBasket - Icelandic D1

Sports leagues established in 1964
Basketball leagues in Iceland
Second level basketball leagues in Europe
Professional sports leagues in Iceland